Derrick John "Tinker" Beets (born 20 September 1941) is a Rhodesian former field hockey player and cricketer. Beets competed in the men's tournament at the 1964 Summer Olympics, and played four first-class cricket matches for Rhodesia in 1961/62.

References

External links
 

1941 births
Living people
Rhodesian male field hockey players
Zimbabwean cricketers
Olympic field hockey players of Rhodesia
Field hockey players at the 1964 Summer Olympics
Sportspeople from Bulawayo